Morinda asteroscepa is a species of plant in the family Rubiaceae. It is found in Malawi and Tanzania, but is on the IUCN Red List vulnerable species (Plantae).

References

asteroscepa
Vulnerable plants
Taxonomy articles created by Polbot